Labra may refer to:

 Labra (Cangas de Onís), a civil parish in Asturias, Spain
 Labra (village), in the territory subject to a dispute between Georgia and Abkhazia
 Labra (surname)

See also
 Labrum (disambiguation) (Latin for "lip"; plural "labra")